João Lopes Marques (born 29 August 1971 in Lisbon) is a Tallinn-based writer, journalist and  blogger.

Work 

In his fiction and non-fiction writings João Lopes Marques sheds light on the topics of identities and alternative History. Irony, ethno-futurism and social caricature are usually present in his writings. He made his debut with "O Homem que queria ser Lindbergh" (2007), the caricature of a young Portuguese man searching for more Eastern longitudes. It was followed by "Terra Java" (2008), on the secret discovery of Australia by the Portuguese, and "Iberiana" (2011), a novel-essay about the mysterious Iberia once thrived in present-day Georgia.

In his self-inflicted exile in Tallinn the author has been depicting Estonians weekly in the national media, first with a column in Eesti Ekspress and currently in the main Estonian daily newspaper Postimees. He has also published three chronicle and essay books about Estonia and Estonians. His novel "Odessa, Vanessa" (2013) is a harsh yet funny caricature of identity an cultural tensions between native Balts and Russians. In Portugal he is known especially as a travel journalist and has been writing for nearly decade about chronicles on customs of other peoples across the world. "Choque Cultural" (2012) is an anthology of travel chronicles across five continents. In his book-essay "O Plano Merkel" (2013) he critically portrays the German Chancellor Angela Merkel, whose domestic populism is currently cannibalizing Europe according to the author.

Lopes Marques is the Baltic correspondent of Lusa - Portuguese news agency and he´s the screenwriter of "Cuidado com a Língua!" (RTP) a popular weekly program on Portuguese language.

With movie director Filipe Araújo he co-founded Blablabla Media an experimental multimedia platform. Their short-movie Iberiana, a free adaptation from the homonymous novel, has been selected for different international festivals.

In October 2011 he was invited to give a talk at TEDxEdges (Lisbon), where he spoke about the multiplying power of curiosity sharing his Nordic dream in exile.

João Lopes Marques studied in Liceu D. Pedro V, Technical University of Lisbon and has degrees in International Relations and Journalism.

Bibliography

Published in Portugal 
 "O Plano Merkel. Como Angela Merkel decide o nosso destino", Marcador, 2013. 
 "Choque Cultural", Marcador, 2012, 
 "Iberiana", Sextante Editora, 2011, 
 "Terra Java", Oficina do Livro, 2008. 
 "O Homem que Queria Ser Lindbergh", Oficina do Livro, 2007,

Published in Spain 
 "Circo Vicioso", translator Rocio Ramos, Blablabla Media, 2010,

Published in Estonia 
 "Odessa, Vanessa", translator Leenu Nigu, Hea Lugu OÜ, 2013, 
 "Estonia: paradise without palmtrees", editor Todd Barth, Hea Lugu OÜ, 2012, 
 "Eesti ilu välimääraja", translator Teve Floren, Hea Lugu OÜ, 2011, 
 "Minu väga ilus eksiil Eestis", translator Teve Floren, Eesti Ajalehed AS, 2011, 
 "Mees, kes tahtis olla Lindbergh", translators Teve Floren and Maarja Kaplinski, Eesti Ajalehed AS, 2010, 
 "Minu ilus eksiil Eestis", translator Teve Floren, Eesti Ajalehed AS, 2010,

Prizes 

In 1995 he was granted the Essay Award of Clube Português de Imprensa. A reportage on Tallinn 2011 European Capital of Culture received one of the two prizes of the Travel Writing Awards in Portugal."Tallinn, blonde, educated and daring" was published in March 2011 by the travel magazine "Rotas & Destinos".

Some Chronicles

In English
 The ultimate Estonian taboo: "Maarja is also leaving Estonia...", The Baltic Times
 "Tobacco?" No, Tobago!", The Baltic Times

In French
 Ce pays qui aime les jeunes et méprise les femmes, Courrier International

In Russian
 WikiФеминизм и сексуально чувствительные государства, The Voice of Russia
 Паранормальная Эстония: полдюжины мистерий, The Voice of Russia
 Тихая гражданская война в Эстонии, The Voice of Russia

In Estonian
 Teen panuse OÜ-le Bolt & Compal
 13 väikest asja eestlastest ja Eestist, Eesti Ekspressis
 Kuidas Eesti mind ikka ja jälle üllatab, Eesti Ekspressis
 Eestil on aeg kapist välja tulla, Naine24
 Olgem valvel - sirgumas on uus põlvkond segaverelisi eestlasi, Naine 24

References

External links 
 Blog "O elogio do Salmão"
 João Lopes Marques (jlopesmarques) Twitter
 Page in Facebook
 Youtube

Living people
1971 births
Portuguese male writers
Portuguese journalists
Male journalists
Portuguese expatriates in Estonia